Cyrus Porter Smith (1800–1877) was an American politician. He was the mayor of Brooklyn from 1839 to 1842.

Early life
He was born on a farm in Hanover, New Hampshire, and worked his way through Dartmouth College. After reading law in Connecticut, he moved to Brooklyn in 1827. Arriving in the city with few contacts and resources, he gained notice through active involvement in the 1828 presidential campaign and as choir-master of the First Presbyterian Church.

Brooklyn civics
Smith held positions as clerk of Brooklyn's Board of Trustees and then on the Corporation Counsel.

In 1839 he was chosen by the Board of Trustees to be Mayor.  He became Brooklyn's first elected mayor in 1840. He was defeated by Democrat Henry C. Murphy in 1842.

Smith later served as a state senator. He was also involved in other civic duties, serving for thirty years as a member of the Board of Education, and as a founder of both Green-Wood Cemetery (his final resting place) and Brooklyn City Hospital.

Smith & Bulkley
After leaving public office, Smith teamed with business partner William F. Bulkley to form Smith & Bulkley.  Smith served as president of the company, with numerous railroad and ferry concerns in Brooklyn, including the Catherine Ferry and the Gouverneur Street Ferry.

Family
One of his granddaughters was the illustrator Pamela Colman Smith.

References 

1800 births
1877 deaths
Dartmouth College alumni
Burials at Green-Wood Cemetery
Mayors of Brooklyn
19th-century American politicians
People from Hanover, New Hampshire
New York (state) Whigs